Flight 331 can refer to:

Aeroflot Flight 331, crashed in Havana, Cuba in 1977
American Airlines Flight 331, crashed in Kingston, Jamaica in 2009

0331